The Taipei Commercial Office in Bogotá, Colombia (Spanish: Oficina Comercial de Taipéi en Bogotá, Colombia) represents the interests of Taiwan in Colombia in the absence of formal diplomatic relations, functioning as a de facto embassy.

Until 1980, Colombia recognised Taiwan as the Republic of China, which, in addition to its embassy in Bogotá, had a consulate general in Barranquilla. In that year, it established diplomatic relations with the People's Republic of China.

There is no longer a counterpart organisation in Taipei, although a Colombian Trade Office was established in 1993 and closed in 2002.

The Office is headed by Ms Francisca Y.T.Chang, its Representative as of 2020.

It also has responsibility for relations with Venezuela. These were previously handled by the Oficina Economica de Taipéi in Caracas, established in 1974, but closed in 2009, following tensions with the government of Hugo Chávez, which had close ties with the People's Republic of China and refused to renew the visas of the office's staff.

See also
 List of diplomatic missions of Taiwan
 List of diplomatic missions in Colombia

References

External links
 Oficina Económica y Cultural de Taipéi en Colombia

Taiwan Commercial Offices
Taiwan